Steve Barker (born 4 April 1971) is an English film director and screenwriter. He wrote and directed the short-film Magic Hour (2002) starring John Simm. In 2008 he made his directorial feature film debut Outpost, starring Ray Stevenson and Richard Brake.

References

External links

About the filming of Outpost

English film directors
Living people
1971 births
English screenwriters
English male screenwriters
Horror film directors
People from Blackpool